The 1914 Norwegian Football Cup was the 13th season of the Norwegian annual knockout football tournament. The tournament was open for 1914 local association leagues (kretsserier) champions. Frigg won their first title, having beaten Lyn (Gjøvik) in the final.

First round

|colspan="3" style="background-color:#97DEFF"|5 September 1914

|}

The rest of the teams had a walkover.

Second round

|colspan="3" style="background-color:#97DEFF"|12 September 1914

|-
|colspan="3" style="background-color:#97DEFF"|27 September 1914

|}

Semi-finals

|colspan="3" style="background-color:#97DEFF"|4 October 1914

|}

Final

See also
1914 in Norwegian football

References

Norwegian Football Cup seasons
Norway
Football Cup